The 2005 FIBA Under-19 World Championship for Women(Arabic: 2005 بطولة العالم لكرة السلة للسيدات تحت 19 سنة) took place in Tunisia from 15 to 24 July 2005. It was co-organised by the International Basketball Federation (FIBA) and Tunisia Basketball Federation.

Twelve national teams competed for the championship. United States came away with the Gold medal by defeating Serbia & Montenegro 97-76 in the final.

Venues
Tunis
Nabeul

Competing nations

Except Tunisia, which automatically qualified as the host nation, the 11 remaining countries qualified through their continents’ qualifying tournaments:

FIBA Africa (2)
  (Hosts)
 
FIBA Asia (2)
 
 

FIBA Americas (3)
 
 
 
FIBA Oceania (1)
 

FIBA Europe (4)

Preliminary round

All times local : WAT (UTC+1)

Group A

Group B

Knockout stage

Bracket

5th place bracket

9th place bracket

Quarterfinals

Classification 9–12

Classification 5–8

Semifinals

Eleventh place game

Ninth place game

Seventh place game

Fifth place game

Third place game

Final

Final standings

Awards

References

External links
 Official Web of 2005 FIBA World Championship for Junior Women.

FIBA Under-19 Women's Basketball World Cup
World Championship for Women
2005 in Tunisian sport
International basketball competitions hosted by Tunisia
2005 in youth sport